David Keith McCallum Jr. (born 19 September 1933) is a British-American actor and musician of Scottish origin. He first gained recognition in the 1960s for playing secret agent Illya Kuryakin in the television series The Man from U.N.C.L.E. In recent years, McCallum has gained renewed international recognition and popularity for his role as NCIS medical examiner Dr. Donald "Ducky" Mallard in the American television series NCIS. With John Leyton and William Russell, he is one of the last living actors from the 1963 classic The Great Escape.

Early life
McCallum was born 19 September 1933, in Maryhill, Glasgow, the second of two sons of orchestral violinist David McCallum Sr. and Dorothy (née Dorman), a cellist. When he was three, his family moved to London for his father to play as the leader of the London Philharmonic Orchestra. Early in the Second World War, he was evacuated back to Scotland, where he lived with his mother at Gartocharn by Loch Lomond.

McCallum won a scholarship to University College School, a boys' independent school in Hampstead, London, where, encouraged by his parents to prepare for a career in music, he played the oboe. In 1946 he began doing boy voices for the BBC radio repertory company. Also involved in local amateur drama, at age 17, he appeared as Oberon in an open-air production of A Midsummer Night's Dream with the Play and Pageant Union. He left school at age 18 and was conscripted for National Service. He joined the British Army's 3rd Battalion the Middlesex Regiment, which was seconded to the Royal West African Frontier Force. In March 1954 he was promoted to lieutenant. After leaving the army he attended the Royal Academy of Dramatic Art (also in London), where Joan Collins was a classmate.

Career
In 1951, McCallum became assistant stage manager of the Glyndebourne Opera Company. He began his acting career doing boy voices for BBC Radio in 1947 and taking bit parts in British films from the late 1950s. His first acting role was in Whom the Gods Love, Die Young playing a doomed royal. A James Dean-themed photograph of McCallum caught the attention of the Rank Organisation, who signed him in 1956. However, in an interview with Alan Titchmarsh broadcast on 3 November 2010, McCallum stated that he had actually held his Equity card since 1946.

Early roles included an outlaw in Robbery Under Arms, (1957) junior  radio operator Harold Bride in A Night to Remember (1958), and a juvenile delinquent in Violent Playground (1958). His first American film was Freud: The Secret Passion (1962), directed by John Huston, which was shortly followed by a role in Peter Ustinov's Billy Budd. McCallum played Lt. Cmdr. Eric Ashley-Pitt (a.k.a., "Dispersal") in The Great Escape, which was released in 1963. He took the role of Judas Iscariot in 1965's The Greatest Story Ever Told. Other television roles included two appearances on The Outer Limits and a guest appearance on Perry Mason in 1964 as defendant Phillipe Bertain in "The Case of the Fifty Millionth Frenchman".

The Man from U.N.C.L.E.

The Man from U.N.C.L.E., intended as a vehicle for Robert Vaughn, made McCallum into a sex symbol, his Beatle-style blond haircut providing a trendy contrast to Vaughn's clean-cut appearance. McCallum's role as the mysterious Russian agent Illya Kuryakin was originally conceived as a peripheral one. McCallum, however, took the opportunity to construct a complex character whose appeal rested largely in what was shadowy and enigmatic about him. Kuryakin's popularity with the audience as well as Vaughn and McCallum's on-screen chemistry were quickly recognized by the producers, and McCallum was elevated to co-star status.

Although the show aired at the height of the Cold War, McCallum's Russian alter ego became a pop culture phenomenon. The actor was inundated with fan letters, and a Beatles-like frenzy followed him everywhere he went. While playing Kuryakin, McCallum received more fan mail than any other actor in Metro-Goldwyn-Mayer's history, including such popular MGM stars as Clark Gable, Robert Taylor and Elvis Presley. Hero worship even led to a record, "Love Ya, Illya", performed by Alma Cogan under the name Angela and the Fans, which was a pirate radio hit in Britain in 1966. A 1990s rock-rap group from Argentina named itself Illya Kuryaki and the Valderramas in honour of The Man from U.N.C.L.E. character.

McCallum received two Emmy Award nominations in the course of the show's four-year run (1964–'68) for playing the intellectual and introverted secret agent.

McCallum and Vaughn reprised their roles of Kuryakin and Solo in a 1983 TV film, Return of the Man from U.N.C.L.E.. In 1986 McCallum reunited with Vaughn again in an episode of The A-Team entitled "The Say U.N.C.L.E. Affair", complete with "chapter titles", the word "affair" in the title, the phrase "Open Channel D", and similar scene transitions.

In an interview for a retrospective television special, McCallum recounted a visit to the White House during which, while he was being escorted to meet the U.S. president, a Secret Service agent told him, "You're the reason I got this job."

After The Man from U.N.C.L.E.

McCallum never quite repeated the popular success he had gained as Kuryakin until NCIS, though he did become a familiar face on British television in such shows as Colditz (1972–74),  (1978), and ITV's science-fiction series Sapphire & Steel (1979–82) opposite Joanna Lumley. In 1975 he played the title character in a short-lived U.S. version of The Invisible Man.

McCallum appeared on stage in Australia in Run for Your Wife (1987–'88), and the production toured the country. Other members of the cast were Jack Smethurst, Eric Sykes and Katy Manning.

McCallum played supporting parts in a number of feature films, although he played the title role in the 1968 thriller, Sol Madrid.

McCallum starred with Diana Rigg in the 1989 TV miniseries Mother Love. In 1991 and 1992 McCallum played gambler John Grey, one of the principal characters in the television series Trainer.
He appeared as an English literature teacher in a 1989 episode of Murder, She Wrote.
In the 1990s McCallum guest-starred in two U.S. television series. In season 1 of seaQuest DSV, he appeared as the law-enforcement officer Frank Cobb of the fictional Broken Ridge of the Ausland Confederation, an underwater mining camp off the coast of Australia by the Great Barrier Reef; he also had a guest-star role in one episode of Babylon 5 as Dr. Vance Hendricks in the Season 1 episode Infection.

In 1994, McCallum narrated the acclaimed documentaries Titanic: The Complete Story for A&E Networks. This was the second project about the Titanic on which he had worked: the first was the 1958 film A Night to Remember, in which he had had a small role.

In the same year McCallum hosted and narrated the TV special Ancient Prophecies. This special, which was followed soon after by three others, told of people and places historically associated with foretelling the end of the world and the beginnings of new eras for mankind.

NCIS

Since 2003 McCallum has starred in the CBS television series NCIS as Dr. Donald "Ducky" Mallard, the team's chief medical examiner and one of the show's most popular characters. In Season 2 Episode 13 "The Meat Puzzle", NCIS Special Agent Caitlin Todd (Sasha Alexander) asks Special Agent Leroy Jethro Gibbs (Mark Harmon), "What did Ducky look like when he was younger?" and Gibbs replies, "Illya Kuryakin".

According to the behind-the-scenes feature on the 2006 DVD of NCIS season 1, McCallum became an expert in forensics to play Mallard, including attending medical examiner conventions. In the feature, Donald P. Bellisario says that McCallum's knowledge became so vast that at the time of the interview he was considering making him a technical adviser on the show.

McCallum appeared at the 21st Annual James Earl Ash Lecture, held 19 May 2005 at the Armed Forces Institute of Pathology, an evening for honouring America's service members. His lecture, "Reel to Real Forensics", with Cmdr. Craig T. Mallak, U.S. Armed Forces medical examiner, featured a presentation comparing the real-life work of the Armed Forces Medical Examiner staff with that of the fictional naval investigators appearing on NCIS.

In late April 2012, it was announced that McCallum had reached an agreement on a two-year contract extension with CBS-TV. The move meant that he would remain an NCIS regular past his eightieth birthday.
In May 2014 he signed another two-year contract. He signed an extension in 2016, beginning a limited schedule in 2017 and since then has renewed his contract for each season separately.

With series lead Mark Harmon's departure from the show in the fall of 2021 (Season 19), McCallum became the last remaining member of the original NCIS cast.

Music
In the 1960s, McCallum recorded four albums for Capitol Records with music producer David Axelrod: Music...A Part of Me (Capitol ST 2432, 1966), Music...A Bit More of Me (Capitol ST 2498, 1966), Music...It's Happening Now! (Capitol ST 2651, 1967), and McCallum (Capitol ST 2748, 1968). The best known of his pieces today is "The Edge", which was sampled by Dr. Dre as the intro and riff to the track "The Next Episode", "M.I.A." by Missin' Linx, "No Regrets" by Masta Ace, and "Actions" by John Legend. McCallum's version of "The Edge" appears on the soundtracks to the 2008 video game Grand Theft Auto IV and the 2017 film Baby Driver.

McCallum did not sing on these records, as many television stars of the 1960s did when offered recording contracts. As a classically trained musician, he conceived a blend of oboe, cor anglais and strings with guitar and drums, and presented instrumental interpretations of hits of the day. The official arranger on the albums was H. B. Barnum. However, McCallum conducted, and contributed several original compositions of his own, over the course of four LPs. The first two, Music...A Part of Me and Music...A Bit More of Me, have been issued together on CD on the Zonophone label. On Open Channel D, McCallum did sing on the first four tracks, "Communication", "House on Breckenridge Lane", "In the Garden, Under the Tree" (the theme song from the film Three Bites of the Apple) and "My Carousel". The music tracks are the same as the Zonophone CD. This CD was released on the Rev-Ola label. The single release of "Communication" reached No. 32 in the UK Singles Chart in April 1966.

In The Man from U.N.C.L.E. episode "The Discotheque Affair", McCallum plays the double bass as part of a band in a night club. He also played guitar and sang his own composition, "Trouble", with Nancy Sinatra on "The Take Me to Your Leader Affair", and played several instruments in "The Off-Broadway Affair".

In the 1970s, McCallum also recorded three H. P. Lovecraft tales for Caedmon Records, an imprint of August Derleth's Arkham House publishing venture: "The Rats in the Walls" (TC 1347, 1973); "The Dunwich Horror" ("slightly abridged"; TC 1467, 1976); and "The Haunter of the Dark" (TC 1617, 1979).

Fiction
In 2016, McCallum published a crime novel entitled Once a Crooked Man. The narrative is set in New York and London and centres on a young actor who tries to foil a murder. McCallum has stated that a second novel is in progress.

Personal life
On 11 May 1957, McCallum married English actress Jill Ireland in London. The couple had met during the production of the film Hell Drivers. The marriage lasted ten years. After leaving McCallum, Ireland married Charles Bronson, whom McCallum had introduced to her while McCallum and Bronson were filming The Great Escape (1963). McCallum and Ireland had three sons: Paul, Jason, and Valentine (Val). Jason, who was adopted, died from an accidental drug overdose in 1989. Val McCallum is a guitar player, playing on and off with Jackson Browne since 2002, Lucinda Williams from 2011 to 2016, and many others. He is a member of the faux country band Jackshit.

In 1967, McCallum married Katherine Carpenter. They have a son, Peter, and a daughter, Sophie. McCallum and his wife are active in charitable organisations that support the United States Marine Corps: Katherine's father was a Marine who served in the Battle of Iwo Jima and her brother was killed in the Vietnam War. On 27 August 1999, McCallum was naturalized as a United States citizen. McCallum has six grandchildren. He was friends with Tibor Rubin.

Filmography

Film

Television

Video games

References

External links

 
 
 
 
 
 

1933 births
Living people
British expatriate male actors in the United States
Male actors from Glasgow
Male actors from Los Angeles
Male actors from New York City
Naturalized citizens of the United States
People educated at University College School
Royal West African Frontier Force officers
Scottish male film actors
Scottish male stage actors
Scottish male television actors
Scottish male video game actors
Scottish male voice actors
20th-century Scottish male actors
21st-century Scottish male actors